is a Japanese snowboarder. Generally, he is called .

Tahara is from Nagano Prefecture. He was ranked Asian Best Player by ISF from 1998 to 2001.
He was noted for his proficiency with the Rodeo flip and Haakon flip.

Rio participated in X-Trail Jam seven times and received the "Highest Air" award in the quarter pipe event in 2003, recording a 5.40m jump, and again in 2004, recording a 5.20m jump.

He also made a cameo appearance in the movie Out Cold.
 
Tahara retired in 2008.

References

Japanese male snowboarders
1972 births
Sportspeople from Nagano Prefecture
Living people